Jackson Hill is a summit in Scott County in the U.S. state of Missouri.

Jackson Hill is named after the Jackson family, the original owners of the site.

References

Mountains of Scott County, Missouri
Mountains of Missouri